U Minh is a township (thị trấn) and capital town of U Minh District, Cà Mau Province, in Vietnam.

Populated places in Cà Mau province
Communes of Cà Mau province
District capitals in Vietnam
Townships in Vietnam